The  is a subcompact crossover SUV (B-segment) produced by the Japanese automaker Toyota since 2020. Adopting the Yaris nameplate primarily for the Japanese, European and Australian markets, it is built on GA-B platform as the XP210 series Yaris hatchback and positioned between the Aygo X or Raize and C-HR in Toyota's crossover SUV lineup. It replaces the Japanese/European market XP110 series Ist/Urban Cruiser.

Overview 
The Yaris Cross was originally planned to be unveiled at the 2020 Geneva Motor Show; however, the show was cancelled due to the COVID-19 pandemic. Toyota then released the first pictures and specifications of the Yaris Cross on 23 April 2020. The model went on sale in Japan in September 2020, Australia in November 2020 and in Europe in mid-2021. The design of the Yaris Cross is a collaboration between Toyota's European and Japanese studios.

Production 
The Yaris Cross is manufactured in Japan at Toyota Motor East Japan and France at Toyota Motor Manufacturing France, the same as the standard Yaris. The company planned to produce 150,000 units of the Yaris Cross per year in its French factory. The first Yaris Cross rolled out the French factory in July 2021.

Markets

Japan 
In Japan, the Yaris Cross was sold from August 2020 and is available in both petrol and hybrid variants. Four-wheel drive is available as an option and Toyota Safety Sense is standard across the lineup. It was initially available in X, G and Z grade levels. On 19 July 2022, two newer grades were added: GR Sport and Z Adventure.

Awards 
The Yaris Cross was awarded as the 2022 "World Urban Car of The Year".

Sales

References

External links 

  (Japan)

Yaris Cross
Cars introduced in 2020
Mini sport utility vehicles
Crossover sport utility vehicles
Front-wheel-drive vehicles
All-wheel-drive vehicles
Hybrid sport utility vehicles
Partial zero-emissions vehicles
Vehicles with CVT transmission